Gronsdorf station is a railway station in the municipality of Haar, located in the Munich district in Bavaria, Germany.

The Gronsdorf stop, located on the city border between Munich and the municipality of Haar, was subsequently established on 1 May 1897. It is located between the Munich district of Waldtrudering and the Haar settlement of Gronsdorf, after which it is named. The stop has an island platform that can be reached via an underpass. Since 1972 only S-Bahn trains stop in Gronsdorf.

References

Railway stations in Bavaria
Munich S-Bahn stations
Buildings and structures in Munich (district)
Railway stations in Germany opened in 1897
1897 establishments in Bavaria